Annika Roloff (born 10 March 1991) is a German athlete who specialises in the pole vault. She competed collegiately for the University of Akron, where she won the 2014 NCAA Pole Vault Championhips.

She qualified for the 2016 Summer Olympics. At the 2016 Summer Olympics, she finished in 21st place in the qualifying round and did not advance to the final. In 2011, she won a bronze medal at the European U23 Championships.

Personal bests

Outdoor

Indoor

References

External links 
 
 
 
 

1991 births
Living people
German female pole vaulters
Athletes (track and field) at the 2016 Summer Olympics
Olympic athletes of Germany
Universiade medalists in athletics (track and field)
Universiade silver medalists for Germany
Medalists at the 2017 Summer Universiade